The Center for Advanced Engineering Environments (CAEE) is a department center of the Frank Batten College of Engineering and Technology at Old Dominion University. The center was created in 2001 to serve as a focal point for research activities pertaining to Collaborative distributed Knowledge discovery and exploitation, Interactive visual simulations, Intelligent synthesis, and advanced learning/training technologies and environments, and their application to future complex engineering systems.

The activities of the center include the synergistic coupling of modeling, visual simulations, intelligent agents, multimedia and synthetic environments, human-technology interactions, computational intelligence, computational, information and collaboration technologies in the multidisciplinary analysis, sensitivity studies, optimization, design and operation of complex engineering systems.

The Center is located at the Old Dominion University Peninsula Higher Education Center in Hampton, Virginia. It is located very close to Nasa's Langley Research Center.

Objectives
The Center has the following five specific objectives:

 Conduct innovative research on applications of the aforementioned areas to complex engineering systems.
 Develop innovative paradigms, technologies and strategies for Advanced Learning / Training Environments.
 Act as a pathfinder, by demonstrating to the research community what can be done (high-potential, high-risk research).  
 Help in identifying future directions of research, and future interdisciplinary areas, in support of future complex engineering systems. 
 Form strategic partnerships with technology providers, industry and research organizations to accelerate technology and workforce development.

In addition to research, the activities of the Center include forming strategic partnerships and collaborative agreements with leading universities, industry and software vendors who are developing collaborative distributed Knowledge discovery and exploitation systems and intelligent synthesis environments for future aerospace and other high-tech engineering systems; organizing workshops and national symposia; and writing monographs and special publications on timely topics.

Research
The  current research activities of the center include:
 Collaborative distributed engineering knowledge discovery and exploitation
 Interactive distributed visual simulation environment and 3D virtual worlds  
 Pervasive blended lifelong cyberlearning (using learning and research networks, personal/collaborative learning environments, 3D interactive immersive classrooms, and other emerging learning spaces / platforms)
 Distributed heterogeneous augmented and hyper-reality systems
 Brain-based, intelligent and multimodal human-technology interfaces
 Intelligent, adaptive cyber-physical ecosystems and emergent engineering

Facilities
The CAEE website provides the following facilities:
 Comprehensive Information Retrieval
 Intelligent Question/Answering – Search Facility
 Patent Applications/Filings Search Facility
 Space and Technology News and Blog Alerts
 Knowledge Repositories
 Links to Multimedia Sites
 NASA Sites
 International Space Agencies
 Other Sites

References

Old Dominion University
Laboratories in the United States
Hampton, Virginia
Educational institutions established in 2001
2001 establishments in Virginia